Satyagraha is a form of nonviolent resistance:
 Satyagraha

Satyagraha may also refer to:

Media
 Satyagrah, a Hindi version of news website Scroll.in
 Satyagraha (film), a 2013 Hindi film
 Satyagraha (opera), a 1979 opera by Philip Glass

People
 Satya Graha (journalist), Indonesian journalist
 Satyagraha Hoerip, Indonesian writer